"" is the national anthem of the United Arab Emirates. It was officially accepted as the national anthem of the United Arab Emirates after the formation of the country in 1971.

History and use
After the country's formal nationalisation in 1971, Egyptian composer Saad Abdel Wahab -- a nephew of famous Egyptian composer Mohammed Abdel Wahab-- created the melody for "ʿĪshī Bilādī" in that same year; however, the anthem did not have lyrics until 1986, which were written by ʿĀrif al-Shaykh.

Lyrics

Notes

References

External links
United Arab Emirates: Ishy Bilady - Audio of the national anthem of United Arab Emirates, with information and lyrics (archive link)
Instrumental version of "Tahiat Alalam" in RealAudio
Vocal version of "Ishy Bilady".

Asian anthems
Emirati patriotic songs
National symbols of the United Arab Emirates
National anthem compositions in F major